The European Parliament election of 1979 took place on 10 June 1979.

Christian Democracy was by far the largest party in Sardinia, with the Italian Communist Party trailing by 7%.

Results

Source:  Ministry of the Interior

See also 
1979 European Parliament election in Italy

Elections in Sardinia
1979 elections in Italy
European Parliament elections in Italy
1979 European Parliament election